The Cladoniaceae are a family of lichenized fungi in the order Lecanorales. It is one of the largest families of lichen-forming fungi, with about 560 species distributed amongst 17 genera. The reindeer moss and cup lichens (Cladonia) belong to this family. The latter genus, which comprises about 500 species, forms a major part of the diet of large mammals in taiga and tundra ecosystems. Many Cladoniaceae lichens grow on soil, but other can use decaying wood, tree trunks, and, in a few instances, rocks as their substrate. They grow in places with high humidity, and cannot tolerate aridity.

Many Cladoniaceae species are characterized by a thallus that has two distinct forms: a scaly or crust-like primary thallus that, depending on the species, can be permanent or temporary, and a secondary fruticose thallus called a podetium or pseudopodetium. Cladoniaceae members form symbiotic associations with green algae from the class Trebouxiophyceae, usually the genus Asterochloris. Five Cladoniaceae species are included in the International Union for Conservation of Nature's Red List of Threatened Species.

Taxonomy
Cladoniaceae was formally introduced to science in 1827 by German naturalist Jonathan Carl Zenker in a publication of Karl Goebel. Zenker's initial concept of the family included genera that are now recognized as separate families, including Baeomycetaceae, Icmadophilaceae, and Stereocaulaceae. William Nylander included 53 Cladonia species worldwide in his 1860 work Synopsis lichenum. When Edvard August Vainio published his three-volume monograph on the Cladoniaceae (Monographia Cladoniarum universalis, 1887, 1894, and 1897), he included 134 species and subspecies. In his circumscription of the family, the genera Pycnothelia, Cladia, and Cladina were included in the genus Cladonia.

Cladoniaceae is now one of the largest families of lichen-forming fungi, with about 560 species distributed amongst 18 genera. The type genus, after which the family was named, is Cladonia, circumscribed by Irish physician and botanist Patrick Browne in 1756. He included 8 species in his new genus. Of their occurrence, he wrote: "All these species are found in great abundance in the mountains of Liguanea: they grow mostly on the ground, among other sorts of moss, but a few ... species chiefly are found upon the decaying trunks of trees."

Synonymy
Several phylogenetic studies have shown that Cladoniaceae is a member of the order Lecanorales, and is closely related to the family Stereocaulaceae. The family Cetradoniaceae, which was created in 2002 to contain the endangered species Cetradonia linearis, was folded into the Cladoniaceae in 2006.

In 2018, Kraichak and colleagues used a technique called temporal banding to reorganize the Lecanoromycetes, proposing a revised system of classification based on correlating taxonomic rank with geological (evolutionary) age. They synonymized the families Squamarinaceae and Stereocaulaceae with the Cladoniaceae, resulting in a large increase in the number of genera and species. The Squamarinaceae had already been included in the Cladoniaceae by previous authors. Although this reorganization has been used in some later publications, the folding of the Stereocaulaceae into the Cladoniaceae was not accepted in a recent analysis. As Robert Lücking explained, "merging of the two families under the name Cladoniaceae is not possible without a conservation proposal because Cladoniaceae (Zenker, 1827) is antedated by Stereocaulaceae (Chevallier, 1826) by one year."

Description

The thallus of Cladoniaceae lichens are fruticose or foliose, and are often dimorphic–consisting of two distinct forms. The primary thallus is ephemeral to persistent, crustose, foliose or squamulose, while the secondary thallus is typically vertical and holds the ascomata. Some species, however, form neither a primary thallus nor any fruticose structures.

The ascomata are in the form of an apothecium, and are biatorine, meaning they are of the lecideine type – light in colour and soft in consistency. They often have a reduced margin. Their colour is typically dark brown (sometimes pale brown), red, ochraceous, or black. The hamathecium (referring to all hyphae between the asci in the hymenium) consists of branched paraphyses, and is amyloid. The asci are somewhat fissitunicate, meaning they have two layers that separate during ascus dehiscence. The ascus structure consists of an apical dome and a tube (both of which are amyloid), which is cylindrical to clavate. Ascospores number eight per ascus, and they are usually non-septate, ellipsoid to more or less spherical in shape, hyaline, and non-amyloid. Except for a few genera that produce septate ascospores (Calathaspis, Pycnothelia and Pilophorus), the hymenium does not generally have characters that are useful in taxonomy. The conidiomata are pycnidia; the conidia are non-septate, usually filiform (thread-like), and hyaline.

Photobionts
The symbiotic algal partner (photobiont) of most Cladoniaceae taxa are unicellular green algae, usually in the genus Asterochloris, but occasionally in the genus Chlorella; both of these genera are in the class Trebouxiophyceae. Eleven species of Asterochloris have found to be associated with genus Cladonia; the algal genus – one of the most common lichen symbionts – occurs in the thalli of more than 20 lichen genera. The most common photobionts in this genus that associate with Cladonia are A. glomerata, A. italiana, and A. mediterranea, with some lineages showing dominance in one or several climatic regions. The algal genus Trebouxia, a very common lichen photobiont, has not been recorded associating with the Cladoniacae. Some Pilophorus species associate with cyanobacterial symbionts (in addition to their association with green algae) in structures called cephalodia. The cyanobacterial genera Nostoc and Stigonema are involved in these tripartite associations.

Development

The development of several Cladoniaceae genera have been studied in detail, although the interpretation of results has sometimes been controversial. Cladoniaceae species begin development with the formation of a prothallus – a fungal layer upon which an algae-containing thallus will develop. It comprises the hyphae from the germination of an ascospore. After the protothallus contacts the alga, lichenization begins with the development of small squamules (scale-like thallus segments) that make up the primary thallus. Most Cladoniaceae have a mixed thallus, consisting of two parts: a base, parallel to the substrate, called the primary thallus and the other erect, the secondary thallus. The primary thallus is squamulose (scaly) or crustose (crustose-like). The secondary thallus consists of vertical structures that are shrubby and hollow, although they can be solid in rare cases. If these structures are made of generative tissue, they are called podetia; when they are made of vegetative tissue, they are called pseudopodetia. The morphology of these structures determines to a large part the taxonomy of the Cladoniaceae, which can range from simple to very complex branching patterns. Cladonia minisaxicola, found in the mountains of Bahia (Brazil) is the only  species in that large genus that is completely crustose and does not develop podetia.

The tips of the podetia have a wide range of morphology in the Cladoniaceae. They can be straight, tapering from a wide base to a point (called subulate), or flaring on cup-shaped scyphi. The scyphi are sometimes closed, or have a central perforation, forming structures called funnels. The podetia are slow-growing, with an annual growth rate generally ranging from 1 to 15 mm.

Habitat and distribution
Cladoniaceae species have been recorded growing in many habitats and on a diversity of substrates, including soil, tree trunks, and rotten wood. In a few cases, Cladoniaceae can grow on rocks, such as Cladonia salmonea which grows on the rock faces of vertical cliffs, or Cladonia pyxidata, which can grow on thin soil on rocks. They are absent from very dry regions. The range of their habitats includes boreal forests, bogs, temperate forests, the tundra of the Arctic and Antarctic, man-made habitats (e.g. roadsides), tropical highlands, and the sandy tropical lowlands of the Amazon rainforest. Twenty-six Cladoniaceae species (25 Cladonia and 1 Cladia) are known to occur in the Galapagos Islands. There, some species form mats on lava flows that have developed little soil. A 2013 monograph of Northern European Cladoniaceae treated 100 species (95 Cladonia, 4 Pilophorus, and the monotypic genus Pycnothelia). In the 2021 key to lichen species in Italy, 86 Cladoniaceae are included.

Conservation

Five Cladoniaceae species have been assessed for the global IUCN Red List: Cetradonia linearis (vulnerable, 2015), Cladonia appalachiensis (endangered, 2020), Cladonia perforata (endangered, 2003), Pilophorus fibula (endangered, 2020), and Gymnoderme insulare (endangered, 2014). On the red list of China's macrofungi, Cladonia delavayi (vulnerable), Cladonia pseudoevansii (critically endangered), Gymnoderma coccocarpum (endangered), and Gymnoderma insulare (endangered) are the representatives of the Cladoniaceae.

Genera
After more than a century of discovery and research, including recent advances in understanding revealed by molecular phylogenetic studies, the Cladoniaceae encompass 17 genera and more than 550 species. This is a list of the genera contained within the Cladoniaceae, based on the Catalogue of Life; this includes taxa formerly classified in the Squamarinaceae, but does not include the Stereocaulaceae. Following the genus name is the taxonomic authority, year of publication, and the number of species:

Calathaspis  – 1 sp.
Carassea  – 1 sp.
Cetradonia  – 1 sp.
Cladia  – ca. 27 spp.
Cladonia  – ca. 500 spp.
Heteromyces  – 1 sp.
Metus  – 3 spp.
Muhria  – 1 sp.
Notocladonia  – 2 spp.
Paralecia  – 1 sp.
Pilophorus  – 17 spp.
Pulchrocladia  – 3 spp.
Pycnothelia  – 2 spp.
Rexiella  – 1 sp.
Sphaerophoropsis  – 2 spp.
Squamella  – 1 sp.
Thysanothecium  – 3 spp.

Myelorrhiza  was transferred from the Cladoniaceae to the Ramalinaceae by Kistenich and colleagues in 2018. Neophyllis, originally classified in the Cladoniaceae, was transferred to Sphaerophoraceae in 1999.

References

Cited literature
 

 
Lichen families
Lecanoromycetes families
Taxa described in 1827
Taxa named by Jonathan Carl Zenker